Gusevsky District is an administrative district (raion), one of the fifteen in Kaliningrad Oblast, Russia. As a municipal division, it is incorporated as Gusevsky Urban Okrug. It is located in the east of the oblast. Its administrative center is the town of Gusev. Population:  37,461 (2002 Census);  The population of Gusev accounts for 76.1% of the district's total population.

Geography
The district is situated in the east of the oblast and is sparsely populated. The rivers in the district include the Pissa and the Angrapa. The southern parts of the district are dominated by forests; in the northern parts forests and steppe pasture prevail.

Administrative and municipal status
Within the framework of administrative divisions, Gusevsky District is one of the fifteen in the oblast. The town of Gusev serves as its administrative center.

As a municipal division, the district has been incorporated as Gusevsky Urban Okrug since June 10, 2013. Prior to that date, the district was incorporated as Gusevsky Municipal District, which was subdivided into one urban settlement and four rural settlements.

Economy
The economy is centered on agriculture. The main railway line and road from Kaliningrad to Moscow pass through the district.

References

Notes

Sources

Districts of Kaliningrad Oblast